Frank S. Ori (born March 20, 1964) is a former American football guard who played for the Minnesota Vikings of the National Football League (NFL). He played college football at University of Northern Iowa.

References 

1964 births
Living people
Players of American football from Illinois
American football offensive guards
Northern Iowa Panthers football players
Minnesota Vikings players
People from Highland Park, Illinois